The Sultanate of Langkat was a Malay Muslim state located in modern Langkat Regency, North Sumatra. It predates Islam in the region, but no historical records before the 17th century survive. It prospered with the opening of rubber plantations and the discovery of oil in Pangkalan Brandan.

Early history 
In approximately 1568, a military commander from the Kingdom of Aru set up a kingdom which was the forerunner of the modern Langkat Sultanate. However, the first sultan was Sri Paduka Tuanku Sultan al-Haj Musa al-Khalid al-Mahadiah Mu’azzam Shah, known as Sultan Musa, who was awarded the title of sultan in 1887 by the Dutch monarch, as were the rulers of Deli, Serdang and Asahan as a token of gratitude for their services to the Dutch East Indies. The Dutch colonial authorities were able to use the Malay sultans to indirectly control eastern Sumatra. These sultans signed political contracts with the Dutch, and as part of their nominal authority over land use, personally received royalties for each land concession they granted allowing foreign interests to control tobacco estates. They also were granted control over their Malay subjects and guaranteed security of their sultanates.

Cooperation with the Dutch colonial authorities
The cooperative relationship with the Dutch made all the sultans enormously wealthy. As well as tobacco, contracts were also signed for oil exploitation, and by 1915, 37.9 percent of the income of the Langkat Sultanate passed directly to Sultan Abdul Aziz Abdul Jalil Rahmad Shah, the son of Sultan Musa, who had inherited the throne in 1893. Abdul Aziz also built the huge Azizi Mosque in Tanjung Pura, seat of the sultanate, and established a religious education centre.

Abdul Aziz was in turn succeeded by his son, Sultan Mahmud Abdul Jalil Rahmad Shah, whose wealth grew in parallel with the income from various concessions and royalties, particularly following the discovery of oil in Pangkalan Brandan. He became the richest of the Sumatra Malay sultans, and by 1933 owned 13 limousines, racehorses and a boat that he never used. The ethnic Malay subjects of the sultan - 18.57 percent of the population in 1930, each received 4 hectares - later reduced to 2.8 hectares - for farming. Despite this huge income, by the end of 1934 the extravagant lifestyle of Sultan Mahmud had resulted in his accumulating a huge debt. As a result, the Dutch took control of the finances of the East Sumatran sultans, arranging loans to pay of the debts, and leaving the sultans with monthly allowances. The cooperation with the Dutch extended to political activities, including the banning of the popular nationalist Partindo party in 1933 and the recall in 1935 of the sultan's nephew Amir Hamzah from his studies in Batavia because he had become too involved in the Indonesian independence movement. Amir Hamzah subsequently married the sultan's daughter, Kamailia.

The end of the sultanate
The sultanate fell as a result of the social revolution of March 1946, a movement against what were seen as feudal and pro-Dutch aristocracies. The Sultanate of Langkat was declared abolished on 5 March. On 9 March, the palace was seized, seven aristocrats were killed and the sultan was handed over the republican authorities. He was released in July 1947 by Dutch forces who had launched a military offensive against the Republic of Indonesia. Mahmud Abdul died in April 1948

List of rulers

 1568-1580: Panglima Dewa Shahdan
 1580-1612: Panglima Dewa Sakti
 1612-1673: Raja Kahar bin Panglima Dewa Sakdi
 1673-1750: Bendahara Raja Badiuzzaman bin Raja Kahar
 1750-1818: Raja Kejuruan Hitam (Tuah Hitam) bin Bendahara Raja Badiuzzaman
 1818-1840: Raja Ahmad bin Raja Indra Bungsu
 1840-1893: Tuanku Sultan Haji Musa al-Khalid al-Mahadiah Muazzam Shah (Tengku Ngah) bin Raja Ahmad
 1893-1927: Tuanku Sultan Abdul Aziz Abdul Jalil Rakhmat Shah bin Sultan Haji Musa
 1927-1948: Tuanku Sultan Mahmud Abdul Jalil Rakhmat Shah bin Sultan Abdul Aziz
 1948-1990: Tengku Atha'ar bin Sultan Mahmud Abdul Jalil Rahmad Shah
 1990-1999: Tengku Mustafa Kamal Pasha bin Sultan Mahmud Abdul Jalil Rahmad Shah
 1999-2001: Tengku Dr Herman Shah bin Tengku Kamil, grandson of Sultan Abdul Aziz Abdul Jalil Rahmad Shah
 2001-2003: Tuanku Sultan Iskandar Hilali Abdul Jalil Rahmad Shah al-Haj bin Tengku Murad Aziz, grandson of Sultan Abdul Aziz Abdul Jalil Rahmad Shah
 2003-Now: Tuanku Sultan Azwar Abdul Jalil Rahmad Shah al-Haj bin Tengku Maimun, grandson of Sultan Abdul Aziz Abdul Jalil Rahmad Shah

See also

 Langkat
 Riau-Lingga
 Malay Indonesian

Gallery

Notes

References

Precolonial states of Indonesia
History of Sumatra
Former sultanates
Former countries in Southeast Asia
Islamic states in Indonesia